Patrick Galbraith and Todd Witsken were the defending champions, but competed this year with different partners.

Witsken teamed up with Ken Flach and lost in the second round to Bryan Shelton and Kenny Thorne.

Galbraith teamed up with Danie Visser and successfully defended his title, by defeating Andre Agassi and John McEnroe 6–4, 6–4 in the final.

Seeds
The first four seeds received a bye to the second round.

Draw

Finals

Top half

Bottom half

References

External links
 Official results archive (ATP)
 Official results archive (ITF)

1992 ATP Tour